18–20 Cathedral Street is an historic building in Dunkeld, Perth and Kinross, Scotland. It is two storeys, with a three-window frontage.

See also 
 List of listed buildings in Dunkeld And Dowally, Perth and Kinross

References 

Cathedral Street 18–20
Category B listed buildings in Perth and Kinross
1715 establishments in Scotland